When the Stars Were Red is a 1991 Czech drama film directed by Dušan Trančík. It was entered into the 41st Berlin International Film Festival.

Cast
 Václav Koubek as Josef Brezík
 Alena Ambrová as Heda
 Ján Sedal as Kadraba
 Jan Jasensky as Father Brezík
 Dezső Garas as Gróf Szentirmay
 Zuzana Kronerová as Beta
 Stanislav Harvan as Little Jozko
 Frantisek Vyrotsko as Viktor
 Miroslav Donutil as Dzurjanik
 Adela Gáborová as Slabejová

References

External links

1991 films
1991 drama films
Slovak-language films
Films directed by Dušan Trančík
Czechoslovak drama films
Slovak drama films